Ek Ghar Banaunga (English: I Will Make a Family Home) is an Indian television soap opera broadcast on Star Plus. The series premiered on 29 April 2013 and 7 June 2014 which starred Rahul Sharma and Ishita Dutta.

Synopsis
Poonam, is faced with the dilemma of how to provide for her parents when she is not around after her marriage, because an ancient Indian tradition says "post marriage, a girl is expected to leave her parental home and take care of her in-laws." Poonam's only brother has settled in the U.S., and could not care less about his responsibility for his parents, as he considers them a burden. But life has planned something else for Poonam – her marriage is fixed with Gautam, who comes from a selfish, greedy and conspiring family who does not care about the marriage, but only for the dowry which they demanded for. On her wedding day to Gautam, Poonam realises the true colours of Gautam's family, and breaks her marriage with him. On the same day, she is married to Aakash, the male protagonist of the story, as well as Poonam's wedding planner, who had been secretly in love with her. Poonam's family decides this marriage, as Aakash is a sensible man and after this day no one else would want to marry Poonam. The problem arises, as Aakash marries Poonam without informing his family, and his family utterly rejects Poonam. However, Poonam is given six months to leave the house, but in that time she wins everybody's heart and becomes an ideal daughter-in-law. Meanwhile, Poonam's parents are left alone to cope with their situation when Aakash sees her concern and decides to bring her parents' home. The problem starts when both parents and the in-laws of the protagonists start staying together. Eventually, Poonam's family too settles down. The rest of the story is the ongoing drama between the households of these two families.

Cast
 Ishita Dutta as Poonam Akash Garg
 Rahul Sharma as Akash Garg 
 Narendra Jha / Hemant Choudhary as Shashikant Garg 
 Neelima Parandekar as Mangaladevi Shashikant Garg 
 Mahaveer Mehta as Rajesh 
 Salina Prakash as Kanika Jai Garg / Kannu
 Pyumori Mehta as Vandana Nath 
 Prachi Parab as Prarthana  
 Mukesh Nathani as Ravikant Garg 
 Bharti Patil as Ravikant's wife 
 Ram Mehar Jangra as Ramesh 
 Priya Shinde as Dolly
 Ankit Arora as Abhishek Ravikant Garg 
 Itishree Singh as Sarita Abhishek Garg 
 Urvashi Upadhyay as Parulben 
 Sachin Chabra as Gautam
 Pratayush Sing as Vilion 
 Ravi Singh as Raghav 
 Mohit Sinha as Radhe 
 Shahbaz Khan as Mata singh

External links
 Official website

References

2013 Indian television series debuts
2014 Indian television series endings
StarPlus original programming
Indian television soap operas